The International Cytokine & Interferon Society (ICIS) is a non-profit organization composed of researchers of cytokines, interferons and chemokine cell biology, molecular biology, biochemistry, and the use of biological response modifiers clinically. As the premier organization in the field of cytokine biology, it has more than 950 member scientists. Katherine A. Fitzgerald is the current president of the society.

History 
Originally founded in 1988 as "The International Cytokine Society" (ICS), after having co-hosted annual meetings with the International Society for Interferon and Cytokine Research (ISICR), the two organizations merged to become the ICIS in 2013.

Journal 
The ICIS manages Cytokine, a peer-reviewed scientific journal covering all aspects of cytokine biology. The journal was established in 1989 and is now published by Elsevier.

Milstein award 
Each year the society selects a recipient of the Seymour & Vivian Milstein Award for excellence in interferon and cytokine research.

References

External links 

 Official website

Cell biology

Non-profit organizations based in the United States
Cytokines